Alash may be a transliteration from various Turkic languages into English of the following terms:

 "Alash", the second name for the Kazakhs and the national motto of the Kazakhs
 Alash Autonomy (1917-1920), unrecognized state
 Alash Orda, Kazakh government of the Alash Autonomy (1917-1920)
 Alash National Patriotic Party, party in Kazakhstan
 Alash (party), Kazakh democratic political party (1917-1920)
 Alash, Kyrgyzstan a village
 Alash (river), a tributary of the Khemchik in Tuva
 Alash (ensemble), a throat singing group from Tuva